A list of films produced in Japan ordered by year in the 1940s.  For an A-Z of films see :Category:Japanese films.  Also see cinema of Japan.

References

Footnotes

Sources

External links
 Japanese film at the Internet Movie Database

1940s
Lists of 1940s films
Films